(Behold, let us go up to Jerusalem), 159, is a church cantata by Johann Sebastian Bach. He composed it in Leipzig for the Sunday , the last Sunday before Lent, and probably first performed it on 27 February 1729. The gospel reading for the Sunday, from the Gospel of Luke, includes Jesus announcing his suffering and death in Jerusalem. The cantata's theme and Bach's music foreshadow his Passion.

The cantata text was written by Picander, who also wrote the text for Bach's St Matthew Passion which would be performed on Good Friday later that year. He included two stanzas from Passion hymns, Paul Gerhardt's "", and a stanza from Paul Stockmann's "" as the closing chorale. Bach structured the work in five movements, and scored it for four vocal soloists, a four-part choir only in the closing chorale, and a Baroque instrumental ensemble of oboe, two violin parts, viola and continuo. The first movement is a dialogue between bass and alto, with the bass as the voice of Christ quoting a line from the gospel reading, and the alto representing his followers who resent the announcement. The second movement is a duet of alto and soprano, with the alto continuing the concerns of a follower, juxtaposed by the chorale. The later three movements follow the usual sequence of recitative, aria and chorale. The text of the aria begins with a quote from the Gospel of John, "Es ist vollbracht" (It is accomplished), which Bach set in his St John Passion, which is also a quote from the gospel reading's announcement.

History and words 
Bach wrote  in Leipzig for Estomihi (Quinquagesima), the last Sunday before Lent. During Lent, Leipzig observed , and no  was permitted. In 1729 the cantata was the last cantata performance in a Sunday service. The next music for voices and orchestra that year would be his St Matthew Passion on Good Friday.  is regarded as part of Bach's fourth cantata cycle, also called Picander cycle.

The prescribed readings for the Sunday were taken from the First Epistle to the Corinthians, "praise of love", and from the Gospel of Luke, healing the blind near Jericho. The gospel reading includes Jesus announcing his suffering in Jerusalem. While Bach's earlier cantatas for the occasion also reflected the healing, this work is focused on reflecting the Passion.

The text was produced by Picander, who also wrote the text for the St Matthew Passion. He published it in his collection Cantaten auf die Sonn- und Fest-Tage (Cantatas for the Sundays and feast days) of 1728. The poet focused on the announcement of suffering, which is regarded as tremendous (movement 1), as an example to follow (2), as a reason to say farewell to earthly pleasures (3), finally as a reason to give thanks (4, 5). In movement 2 the poet juxtaposed his recitative by stanza 6 of Paul Gerhardt's "", a hymn that appears in the St Matthew Passion in this and four other stanzas. The beginning of movement 4, "" ("It is accomplished"), appears literally in the Gospel of John as one of the Sayings of Jesus on the cross, and is announced in the Sunday's gospel reading: "... all things that are written by the prophets concerning the Son of man shall be accomplished". Bach's St John Passion contains an alto aria beginning with this line, as a summary immediately after the death of Jesus. The closing chorale of the cantata is the last of 33 stanzas of Paul Stockmann's "" (1633).

Bach probably first performed the cantata on 27 February 1729.

Music

Structure and scoring 
Bach structured the cantata in five movements. He scored the work for four vocal soloists (soprano (S), alto (A), tenor (T) and bass (B)), a four-part choir only in the closing chorale, and a Baroque instrumental ensemble of oboe (Ob), two violins (Vl), viola (Va) and basso continuo. The first movement is a dialogue of the bass as the vox Christi who sings a quotation from the gospel, and the alto representing a follower, named a "faithful Soul" by Dürr. The second movement is a dialogue of the alto, and the soprano (S) singing a stanza from Paul Gerhardt's hymn. The soprano part can be sung by a soloist or the soprano section of the choir. The third and to fifth movements are more the usual sequence of recitative, aria and four-part closing chorale. The duration of the cantata is given as 17 minutes.

In the following table of the movements, the scoring, keys and time signatures are taken from Dürr. The continuo, which plays throughout, is not shown.

Movements

1 
Without any choral opening, the first movement is a dialogue of two characters. The alto represents a follower, expressing the reaction to the announcement. Bach achieves dramatic contrast, setting the words of Jesus as an arioso, accompanied by the continuo, while the alto answers in a recitativo accompagnato, with the strings. This instrumentation is opposite to the treatment in the St Matthew Passion, where the words of Jesus are accompanied by the "halo" of a string quartet.

The line from the gospel is broken in three parts, interrupted by the alto.  ("Behold", literally: see!) is expressed in a long melisma. After an intervention of the alto, the move uphill in illustrated by an upward scale. After another reply of the also, the destination is named: Jerusalem. The phrase is repeated several times, accenting different words each time, to present different aspects of its meaning following the principle of monody.
John Eliot Gardiner, who conducted the Bach Cantata Pilgrimage in 2000, compared the expressiveness of the alto's "outpouring of grief" to the aria "Ach Golgatha" from the St Matthew Passion.

2 
In the second movement, the expressive melodic lines of the alto are juxtaposed to the chorale on the melody of "". The Soul begins "" ("I follow after You"), while the first line from the chorale states:   "" ("I will stay here with You"), The process, with the alto voice beginning sooner and ending later than the chorale line, is repeated for the other lines of the chorale, in the end combining the alto's "" ("And if You must depart at last, You shall find Your grave in me"), to the choral's "" ("Then I will hold You fast in my arm and bosom"), The melodic treatment is described as powerful and expressive.

3 
A secco recitative of the tenor expresses first sorrow about the way to death, "" ("Now, over You, my Jesus, I will grieve in my corner"), and finally turns to the expectation for an ultimate union with Jesus: "" ("... until I am redeemed through You; then I will be refreshed with You").

4 
The cantata culminates in the forth movement, with the vox Christi reflecting the completion of the Passion, "". The oboe introduces a meditative motif. The bass picks it up, and both rest on long sustained string chords. The middle section illustrates the words "" ("Now I will hasten") in runs of the voice, oboe and now also the violins. A quasi  resumes the first motif, now on the words "" ("World, good night"). The aria was described by a reviewer as a "hauntingly affective reflection on Jesus's last words from
the cross", with a "wrenchingly beautiful oboe line", "rich suspensions", and an "unusually contoured melody".

5 
In Picander's printed cantata text, another recitative, "" introduced the closing chorale. It is unclear if Bach intentionally did not compose it, or if it got lost. The closing chorale is a four-part setting of Stockmann's hymn which summarises the Passion: "" ("Jesus, Your passion is pure joy to me"). Gardiner notes that Bach set the melody by Melchior Vulpius with "wonderfully satisfying chromatic harmonies over a lyrical bass line".

Manuscripts and publication 
Bach's manuscript autograph of the score is lost.

The New Bach Edition (Neue Bach-Ausgabe, NBA) published the score in 1992, edited by Christoph Wolff, with the critical commentary published in 1998.

Recordings 
{| class="wikitable sortable plainrowheaders" style="margin-right: 0;"
|-
|+ Recordings of Sehet, wir gehn hinauf gen Jerusalem
|-
! scope="col" | Title
! scope="col" | Conductor / Choir / Orchestra
! scope="col" | Soloists
! scope="col" | Label
! scope="col" | Year
! scope="col" | Instr.
|-

References

Cited sources

External links 
 
 Cantata BWV 159 Sehet, wir gehn hinauf gen Jerusalem history, scoring, sources for text and music, translations to various languages, discography, discussion, Bach Cantatas Website
 BWV 159 Sehet, wir gehn hinauf gen Jerusalem English translation, University of Vermont
 BWV 159 Sehet, wir gehn hinauf gen Jerusalem text, scoring, University of Alberta
 Sehet, wir gehn hinauf gen Jerusalem, BWV 159: performance by the Netherlands Bach Society (video and background information)
 

Church cantatas by Johann Sebastian Bach
1729 compositions